Eugene Russell Hendrix (May 17, 1847 – November 11, 1927) was a bishop of the Methodist Episcopal Church, South in the U.S., elected in 1886.

Biography
Eugene Russell Hendrix was born in Fayette, Missouri on May 17, 1847. He graduated from Wesleyan University in 1867, and from Union Theological Seminary in 1869.

He died at his home in Kansas City, Missouri on November 11, 1927, and was buried at Mount Washington Cemetery in Independence.

Hendrix College in Conway, Arkansas, is named in his honor.

Family
He was married to Ann Elizabeth Scarritt (born May 23, 1851), daughter of Nathan Spencer Scarritt (1821–1890) and Martha Matilda Chick (died 1873), on June 20, 1872.

See also
List of bishops of the United Methodist Church

References

External links

1847 births
1927 deaths
American Methodist bishops
Bishops of the Methodist Episcopal Church, South
Union Theological Seminary (New York City) alumni
Wesleyan University alumni